Winburn is a neighborhood in northeast Lexington, Kentucky, United States. Its boundaries are I-75/ I-64 to the north, Newtown Pike to the west, Citation Boulevard to the south, and Russell Cave Road to the east. The smaller Griffin Gate neighborhood is typically included as part of Winburn.

Neighborhood statistics

 Area: 
 Population: 1,424
 Population density: 3,356 people per square mile
 Median household income: $31,797

References

Neighborhoods in Lexington, Kentucky